Unloved is a 2001 Japanese romance film directed by Kunitoshi Manda, starring Yoko Moriguchi, Shunsuke Matsuoka and Tōru Nakamura. It won the Grand Rail d'Or prize and the Future Talent prize at the 2001 Cannes Film Festival.

Plot
Mitsuko (Yoko Moriguchi), a young woman, becomes involved with Hiroshi (Shunsuke Matsuoka), a poor young man who lives her downstairs, and Eiji (Tōru Nakamura), a rich entrepreneur.

Cast
 Yoko Moriguchi as Mitsuko Kageyama
 Shunsuke Matsuoka as Hiroshi Shimokawa
 Tōru Nakamura as Eiji Katsumo

Reception
Jonathan Crow of Allmovie gave the film 2 out of 5 stars and said, "Unloved is uninvolving and overly talky." David Stratton of the Variety magazine said, "[Moriguchi] gives a good performance as the exacting heroine, while Nakamura and Matsuoka lend solid support as the two wildly contrasted guys."

References

External links
 

2001 films
Japanese romance films
2000s romance films
Films scored by Kenji Kawai
2000s Japanese films